Twelve Deadly Cyns...and Then Some is a greatest hits album by American singer Cyndi Lauper. It was released on August 22, 1994, through Epic Records. The album contains the most successful singles from the singer's first four studio albums, in addition to three new songs: "(Hey Now) Girls Just Want to Have Fun", "I'm Gonna Be Strong" and "Come On Home". To promote the record the singer embarked on a worldwide tour as well as releasing music videos for two of the new songs. A video album was released in parallel and contained videos of fourteen songs included in the audio version and also an interview with Lauper.

The project revitalized the artist's career, being one of her best-selling albums to date, with more than 4 million copies worldwide.

Background
After the release of Cyndi Lauper's third album A Night to Remember, in 1989, Epic was disappointed by its poor reception and the singer's declining in popularity in the charts and record sales. Fearing another failure, the Epic had the idea of releasing a compilation of the singer's greatest hits. The idea was badly received by Lauper, who believed she had few albums and singles released so, in agreement with the label, decided that after her next album, which she was very hopeful about, it would be the right time to release a greatest hits. A different greatest-hits album titled 13 Deadly Cyns was considered to be released in 1992 prior to the release of Cyndi's fourth album Hat Full of Stars, with a promo tape being released in the U.K. that year. This version of the album included all singles (worldwide and regional) from Cyndi's first three albums (except "When You Were Mine", "Boy Blue" and "Primitive") as well as her 1992 single "The World Is Stone". The shorter 7" studio edit of "Money Changes Everything" was included on this promotional release instead of the album version which would appear on the final release.

Production and content
The singer selected the songs that would make the album, among the new tracks are "I'm Gonna Be Strong", which she previously recorded with the band Blue Angel, in 1984 and a new version of "Girls Just Wanna Have Fun" produced by the DJ Junior Vasquez. The song uses the original lyrics of the 1983 song and includes a short section based on the 1974 hit song "Come and Get Your Love" by Redbone. A music video featuring drag queens was shot to accompany this single and it aired heavily on television. It was also featured in the film To Wong Foo, Thanks for Everything! Julie Newmar. Also included and released as a single is a song titled "Come on Home" which Cyndi co-wrote with Jan Pulsford, who would work with Cyndi on much of her next album, 1996's Sisters of Avalon. According to the singer, the fact of including new songs on the record is because she believes that "music is a living thing" and for that reason she didn't want to make an album with old songs only, since a new audience was consuming her music at that moment.

A notable omission of the compilation is the song "The Goonies 'R' Good Enough", soundtrack of The Goonies film, and one of the singer's biggest hits, being top 10 on the Billboard Hot 100, the song was avoided by Lauper due to the fights that marked the production of the song. Lauper stated in an interview with Matthew Rettenmund, she despised the song.
Another track that was released as a single with a promotional music video and was not included is "Hole in My Heart (All the Way to China)", soundtrack to the 1988 film Vibes, starring the Lauper herself, the track was included only in the Japanese edition of the disc due to problems with the division of royalties. A video album was released in VHS, LaserDisc and later DVD and include an unpublished interview with Lauper and all the music videos from the international version of the disc. The video peaked at #12 on Billboard Top Music Videos.

Reception
In his review of AllMusic, music critic Stephen Thomas Erlewine gave the album four out of five stars and said that although she returned to success with a collection of greatest hits, with the exception of the songs "True Colors" and "Change of Heart", the only songs by Lauper that have really been successful are on She's So Unusual, which he said was "a more consistent and fun album". Robert Christgau gave the album a "C" rating and, like Erlewine, felt that Lauper's subsequent material (after She's So Unusual) was inferior. The album sold 565,000 copies in the United States, according to Nielsen SoundScan. As of 1997, the album has sold over 4 million copies worldwide.

Track listing

Personnel
Cyndi Lauper, Stacy Drummond – art direction
Michelle Willems – design
Kim Stringfellow – photography
Marlow Palleja – cover lettering
Laura Wills – styling
Jody Morlock – makeup
Helena Occhipinti – hair

Charts

Weekly charts

Year-end charts

Certifications and sales

References

Cyndi Lauper compilation albums
1994 greatest hits albums
Epic Records compilation albums